Manga is a town located in the province of Zoundwéogo in Burkina Faso. It is the capital of Zoundwéogo Province and Centre-Sud Region.

References 

Populated places in the Centre-Sud Region
Zoundwéogo Province